Macrobrachium srilankense is a species of freshwater prawn belong the family Palaemonidae. The species was first described by Costa in the year 1979. It is reported from Sri Lanka.

References

Palaemonidae
Freshwater crustaceans of Asia
Crustaceans described in 1979
Fauna of Sri Lanka